Cropley Ashley-Cooper, 6th Earl of Shaftesbury Bt (21 December 1768 – 2 June 1851), styled The Honourable Cropley Ashley-Cooper until 1811, was a British politician. He was the father of the social reformer Anthony Ashley-Cooper, 7th Earl of Shaftesbury.

Background
Shaftesbury was a younger son of Anthony Ashley-Cooper, 4th Earl of Shaftesbury, by his second wife Mary, daughter of Jacob Bouverie, 1st Viscount Folkestone. He was educated at Winchester School and Christ Church, Oxford.

Political career
Shaftesbury was elected Member of Parliament for Dorchester in 1790, a seat he held until 1811. The latter year he succeeded his elder brother in the earldom and entered the House of Lords, in which he served as Chairman of Committees.

Family
Lord Shaftesbury married Lady Anne, daughter of George Spencer, 4th Duke of Marlborough, on 10 December 1796. They had ten children. Their second daughter Lady Harriet Anne married Henry Lowry-Corry and was the mother of Montagu Corry, 1st Baron Rowton. Their fifth and penultimate son, Anthony Francis Ashley Cooper (1810–25), while at Eton was killed in a pugilistic contest. Two of Shaftesbury's other sons were Anthony Henry Ashley-Cooper and Anthony William Ashley.

Lord Shaftesbury died in June 1851, aged 82, and was succeeded in the earldom by his son, Anthony, the noted social reformer.

References

External links

1768 births
1851 deaths
People educated at Westminster School, London
Alumni of Christ Church, Oxford
6
Cropley
Members of the Parliament of Great Britain for English constituencies
British MPs 1790–1796
British MPs 1796–1800
Members of the Parliament of the United Kingdom for English constituencies
UK MPs 1801–1802
UK MPs 1802–1806
UK MPs 1806–1807
UK MPs 1807–1812
Shaftesbury, E6
Younger sons of earls